Ropica illiterata is a species of longhorn beetle in the family Cerambycidae. It was described by Pascoe in 1865. It is known from Borneo and Sumatra.

References

illiterata
Beetles described in 1865